Ursula Pruneda Blum (born Mexico City, 1971) is a Mexican actress of the stage and screen. She trained under Luis de Tavira, Raúl Quintanilla, José Caballero, Esther Seligson, Sandra Félix and Héctor Mendoza, among others. She has acted in numerous theatrical productions, feature films, short films, video artworks and telenovelas. She is best known for her work in the 2012 film El Sueno de Lu,  which won her the Ariel Award for Best Actress, among many other nominations and awards.

References

1971 births
21st-century Mexican actresses
Actresses from Mexico City
Ariel Award winners
Date of birth missing (living people)
Living people
Mexican film actresses
Mexican stage actresses
Mexican telenovela actresses